The 2021 Baltimore Orioles season was the 121st season in Baltimore Orioles franchise history, the 68th in Baltimore, and the 30th at Oriole Park at Camden Yards. They significantly failed at attempting to improve on their  record from the previous year. The Orioles endured two different losing streaks of 14 or more between the middle and the end of May, as well as between August 3 and August 24. The Orioles pitching staff combined for a franchise-worst ERA of 5.84 and yielded 911 earned runs in the season, which led the MLB and was the most earned runs surrendered by a pitching staff since the 2001 Texas Rangers allowed 913 earned runs. All of the team's pitchers that made a start finished the season with a losing record. The Orioles were eliminated from playoff contention on August 28th with their loss to the Tampa Bay Rays. They suffered their 3rd 100+ loss season in four years with their loss to the Boston Red Sox on September 17th. With the Orioles loss in the season finale against the Blue Jays, they suffered their second 110-loss season in team history; it was also the third such season in overall franchise history, going back to their time as the St. Louis Browns.

Despite the team's atrocious performance, Trey Mancini, who missed the 2020 season with colon cancer, won the AL Comeback Player of the Year award.

Regular season standings

American League East

American League Wild Card

Orioles team leaders

Updated through game of October 3.

 Minimum 3.1 plate appearances per team games played
AVG qualified batters: Mullins, Mountcastle, Mancini, Hays

 Minimum 1 inning pitched per team games played
ERA & WHIP qualified pitchers: No qualifiers

Record vs. Opponents

Game log  

|- style="background:#bbb;"
| — || April 1 || @ Red Sox || colspan=7 | Postponed (rain). Makeup date April 2.
|- style="background:#bfb;"
| 1 || April 2 || @ Red Sox || 3–0 || Means (1–0) || Eovaldi (0–1) || Valdez (1) || 4,452 || 1–0 || W1
|- style="background:#bfb;"
| 2 || April 3 || @ Red Sox || 4–2 || Plutko (1–0) || Houck (0–1) || Valdez (2) || 4,571 || 2–0 || W2
|- style="background:#bfb;"
| 3 || April 4 || @ Red Sox || 11–3 || Zimmermann (1–0) || Richards (0–1) || — || 4,458 || 3–0 || W3
|- style="background:#fbb;"
| 4 || April 5 || @ Yankees || 0–7 || Montgomery (1–0) || López (0–1) || — || 9,008 || 3–1 || L1 
|- style="background:#fbb;"
| 5 || April 6 || @ Yankees || 2–7 || Cole (1–0) || Kremer (0–1) || — || 9,404 || 3–2 || L2
|- style="background:#bfb;"
| 6 || April 7 || @ Yankees || 4–3  || Valdez (1–0) || Green (0–1) || Fry (1) || 10,254 || 4–2 || W1
|- style="background:#fbb;"
| 7 || April 8 || Red Sox || 3–7 || Rodríguez (1–0) || Harvey (0–1) || — || 10,150 || 4–3 || L1
|- style="background:#fbb;"
| 8 || April 10 || Red Sox || 4–6  || Barnes (1–0) || Tate (0–1) || Andriese (1) || 9,307 || 4–4 || L2
|- style="background:#fbb;"
| 9 || April 11 || Red Sox || 9–14 || Pivetta (2–0) || López (0–2) || — || 8,171 || 4–5 || L3
|- style="background:#bbb;"
| — || April 12 || Mariners || colspan=7 | Postponed (rain). Makeup date April 13 as part of doubleheader.
|- style="background:#fbb;"
| 10 || April 13 || Mariners || 3–4  || Montero (1–0) || Scott (0–1) || Graveman (1) || 4,147 || 4–6 || L4
|- style="background:#bfb;"
| 11 || April 13 || Mariners || 7–6  || Valdez (2–0) || Sadler (0–1) || — || 4,147 || 5–6 || W1
|- style="background:#bbb;"
| — || April 14 || Mariners || colspan=7 | Postponed (rain). Makeup date April 15 as part of doubleheader.
|- style="background:#fbb;"
| 12 || April 15 || Mariners || 2–4  || Gonzales (1–1) || Scott (0–2) || Graveman (2) || 5,060 || 5–7 || L1
|- style="background:#fbb;"
| 13 || April 15 || Mariners || 1–2  || Dunn (1–0) || Zimmermann (1–1) || Middleton (2) || 5,060 || 5–8 || L2
|- style="background:#bfb;"
| 14 || April 16 || @ Rangers || 5–2 || López (1–2) || Foltynewicz (0–3) || Valdez (3) || 22,173 || 6–8 || W1
|- style="background:#bfb;"
| 15 || April 17 || @ Rangers || 6–1 || Lakins (1–0) || Rodríguez (0–1) || — || 29,338 || 7–8 || W2
|- style="background:#fbb;"
| 16 || April 18 || @ Rangers || 0–1  || King (1–0) || Lakins (1–1) || — || 24,267 || 7–9 || L1
|- style="background:#bfb;"
| 17 || April 20 || @ Marlins || 7–5 || Harvey (1–1) || Neidert (0–1) || Valdez (4) || 4,540 || 8–9 || W1
|- style="background:#fbb;"
| 18 || April 21 || @ Marlins || 0–3 || Rogers (1–2) || Zimmermann (1–2) || García (4) || 4,028 || 8–10 || L1
|- style="background:#fbb;"
| 19 || April 23 || Athletics || 1–3 || Irvin (2–2) || López (1–3) || Diekman (2) || 7,574 || 8–11 || L2
|- style="background:#fbb;"
| 20 || April 24 || Athletics || 2–7 || Bassitt (2–2) || LeBlanc (0–1) || — || 7,616 || 8–12 || L3
|- style="background:#bfb;"
| 21 || April 25 || Athletics || 8–1 || Means (2–0) || Luzardo (1–2) || — || 8,107 || 9–12 || W1
|- style="background:#bfb;"
| 22 || April 26 || Yankees || 4–2 || Harvey (2–1) || García (0–1) || Valdez (5) || 6,367 || 10–12 || W2
|- style="background:#fbb;"
| 23 || April 27 || Yankees || 1–5 || Kluber (1–2) || Zimmermann (1–3) || — || 6,662 || 10–13 || L1
|- style="background:#fbb;"
| 24 || April 28 || Yankees || 0–7 || Germán (2–2) || Kremer (0–2) || — || 7,338 || 10–14 || L2
|- style="background:#bfb;"
| 25 || April 29 || Yankees || 4–3  || Scott (1–2) || Loaisiga (2–1) || — || 7,738 || 11–14 || W1
|- style="background:#bfb;"
| 26 || April 30 || @ Athletics || 3–2 || Means (3–0) || Fiers (0–1) || Valdez (6) || 5,777 || 12–14 || W2
|-

|- style="background:#bfb;"
| 27 || May 1 || @ Athletics || 8–4 || Harvey (3–1) || Luzardo (1–3) || — || 6,469 || 13–14 || W3
|- style="background:#fbb;"
| 28 || May 2 || @ Athletics || 5–7 || Petit (4–0) || Lakins (1–2) || Trivino (5) || 5,862 || 13–15 || L1
|- style="background:#bfb;"
| 29 || May 3 || @ Mariners || 5–3 || Sulser (1-0) || Misiewicz (2–1) || Valdez (7) || 5,776 || 14–15 || W1
|- style="background:#fbb;"
| 30 || May 4 || @ Mariners || 2–5 || Montero (3–1) || Lakins (1–3) || — || 6,504 || 14–16 || L1
|- style="background:#bfb;"
| 31 || May 5 || @ Mariners || 6–0 || Means (4–0) || Kikuchi (1–2) || — || 6,742 || 15–16 || W1
|- style="background:#fbb;"
| 32 || May 7 || Red Sox || 2–6 || Rodríguez (5–0) || Harvey (3–2) || — || 7,724 || 15–17 || L1
|- style="background:#fbb;"
| 33 || May 8 || Red Sox || 6–11 || Richards (2–2) || Lowther (0–1) || — || 10,598 || 15–18 || L2
|- style="background:#fbb;"
| 34 || May 9 || Red Sox || 3–4 || Pivetta (5–0) || Kremer (0–3) || Barnes (8) || 10,274 || 15–19 || L3
|- style="background:#bfb;"
| 35 || May 10 || Red Sox || 4–1 || Scott (2–2) || Andriese (1–2) || Valdez (8) || 6,826 || 16–19 || W1
|- style="background:#fbb;"
| 36 || May 11 || @ Mets || 2–3 || Familia (1–0) || Valdez (2–1) || — || 7,930 || 16–20 || L1 
|- style="background:#fbb;"
| 37 || May 12 || @ Mets || 1–7 || Walker (3–1) || Harvey (3–3) || — || 8,035 || 16–21 || L2
|- style="background:#fbb;"
| 38 || May 14 || Yankees || 4–5 || Kluber (3–2) || Lakins (1–4) || Loáisiga (2) || 10,809 || 16–22 || L3
|- style="background:#fbb;"
| 39 || May 15 || Yankees || 2–8 || Germán (3–2) || López (1–4) || — || 10,767 || 16–23 || L4
|- style="background:#bfb;"
| 40 || May 16 || Yankees || 10–6 || Zimmermann (2–3) || King (0–1) || — || 11,070 || 17–23 || W1
|- style="background:#fbb;"
| 41 || May 18 || Rays || 6–13 || Kittredge (4–0) || Harvey (3–4) || — || 5,429 || 17–24 || L1
|- style="background:#fbb;"
| 42 || May 19 || Rays || 7–9 || Thompson (3–2) || Fry (0–1) || Fairbanks (1) || 6,581 || 17–25 || L2
|- style="background:#fbb;"
| 43 || May 20 || Rays || 1–10 || Hill (3–1) || Kremer (0–4) || — || 6,916 || 17–26 || L3
|- style="background:#fbb;"
| 44 || May 21 || @ Nationals || 2–4 || Strasburg (1–1) || López (1–5) || — || 14,369 || 17–27 || L4
|- style="background:#fbb;"
| 45 || May 22 || @ Nationals || 9–12 || Hudson (3–0) || Plutko (1–1) || Hand (6) || 15,440 || 17–28 || L5
|- style="background:#fbb;"
| 46 || May 23 || @ Nationals || 5–6 || Corbin (3–3) || Harvey (3–5) || Hand (7) || 14,618 || 17–29 || L6
|- style="background:#fbb;"
| 47 || May 24 || @ Twins || 3–8 || Alcalá (1–1) || Scott (2–3) || — || 8,530 || 17–30 || L7
|- style="background:#fbb;"
| 48 || May 25 || @ Twins || 4–7 || Berríos (5–2) || Kremer (0–5) || Rogers (3) || 9,969 || 17–31 || L8
|- style="background:#fbb;"
| 49 || May 26 || @ Twins || 2–3 || Pineda (3–2) || López (1–6) || Robles (3) || 10,574 || 17–32 || L9
|- style="background:#fbb;"
| 50 || May 27 || @ White Sox || 1–5 || Cease (3–1) || Tate (0–2) || — || 9,671 || 17–33 || L10
|- style="background:#bbb;"
| — || May 28 || @ White Sox || colspan=7 | Postponed (rain). Makeup date May 29 as part of doubleheader.
|- style="background:#fbb;"
| 51 || May 29 || @ White Sox || 4–7  || Keuchel (4–1) || Harvey (3–6) || Hendriks (11) || 20,029 || 17–34 || L11
|- style="background:#fbb;"
| 52 || May 29 || @ White Sox || 1–3  || Lynn (6–1) || Means (4–1) || Hendriks (12) || 20,029 || 17–35 || L12
|- style="background:#fbb;"
| 53 || May 30 || @ White Sox || 1–3 || Giolito (5–4) || Tate (0–3) || Hendriks (13) || 21,067 || 17–36 || L13
|- style="background:#fbb;"
| 54 || May 31 || Twins || 2–3  || Rogers (3–3) || Plutko (1–2) || Robles (4) || 11,010 || 17–37 || L14
|-

|- style="background:#bfb;"
| 55 || June 1 || Twins || 7–4 || Zimmermann (3–3) || Pineda (3–3) || Sulser (1) || 5,337 || 18–37 || W1
|- style="background:#bfb;"
| 56 || June 2 || Twins || 6–3 || T. Wells (1–0) || Dobnak (1–5) || — || 5,945 || 19–37 || W2
|- style="background:#bfb;"
| 57 || June 4 || Indians || 3–1 || Sulser (2–0) || Shaw (1–1) || Fry (2) || 12,009 || 20–37 || W3
|- style="background:#fbb;"
| 58 || June 5 || Indians || 4–10 || Civale (8–2) || Means (4–2) || — || 9,969 || 20–38 || L1
|- style="background:#bfb;"
| 59 || June 6 || Indians || 18–5 || López (2–6) || Quantrill (0–2) || — || 9,423 || 21–38 || W1
|- style="background:#bfb;"
| 60 || June 8 || Mets || 10–3 || Zimmermann (4–3) || Peterson (1–5) || — || 9,431 || 22–38 || W2
|- style="background:#fbb;"
| 61 || June 9 || Mets || 1–14 || Walker (5–2) || Harvey (3–7) || — || 9,584 || 22–39 || L1
|- style="background:#fbb;"
| 62 || June 11 || @ Rays || 2–4 || Yarbrough (4–3) || Akin (0–1) || Fairbanks (2) || 6,211 || 22–40 || L2
|- style="background:#fbb;"
| 63 || June 12 || @ Rays || 4–5 || McHugh (1–1) || López (2–7) || Castillo (11) || 9,225 || 22–41 || L3
|- style="background:#fbb;"
| 64 || June 13 || @ Rays || 1–7 || Fleming (6–4) || Zimmermann (4–4) || — || 9,101 || 22–42 || L4
|- style="background:#fbb;"
| 65 || June 14 || @ Indians || 3–4 || Sandlin (1–0) || Kremer (0–6) || Clase (10) || 11,181 || 22–43 || L5
|- style="background:#fbb;"
| 66 || June 15 || @ Indians || 2–7 || Karinchak (4–2) || Harvey (3–8) || — || 12,025 || 22–44 || L6
|- style="background:#fbb;"
| 67 || June 16 || @ Indians || 7–8 || Civale (10–2) || Akin (0–2) || Clase (11) || 12,825 || 22–45 || L7
|- style="background:#fbb;"
| 68 || June 17 || @ Indians || 3–10 || Stephan (1–0) || López (2–8) || — || 15,121 || 22–46 || L8
|- style="background:#bfb;"
| 67 || June 18 || Blue Jays || 7–1 || T. Wells (2–0) || Ray (4–3) || — || 13,284 || 23–46 || W1
|- style="background:#fbb;"
| 70 || June 19 || Blue Jays || 7–10 || Romano (4–1) || Fry (0–2) || — || 10,721 || 23–47 || L1
|- style="background:#fbb;"
| 71 || June 20 || Blue Jays || 4–7 || Ryu (6–4) || Harvey (3–9) || Chatwood (1) || 14,917 || 23–48 || L2
|- style="background:#fbb;"
| 72 || June 21 || Astros || 2–10 || Odorizzi (2–3) || Akin (0–3) || — || 7,414 || 23–49 || L3
|- style="background:#fbb;"
| 73 || June 22 || Astros || 1–3 || Greinke (8–2) || López (2–9) || Pressly (11) || 8,510 || 23–50 || L4
|- style="background:#fbb;"
| 74 || June 23 || Astros || 0–13 || Urquidy (6–3) || Eshelman (0–1) || — || 10,013 || 23–51 || L5
|- style="background:#fbb;"
| 75 || June 24 || @ Blue Jays || 0–9 || Kay (1–2) || Kremer (0–7) || — || 6,264 || 23–52 || L6
|- style="background:#bfb;"
| 76 || June 25 || @ Blue Jays || 6–5  || Fry (1–2) || Thornton (1–3) || Sulser (2) || 7,844 || 24–52 || W1
|- style="background:#fbb;"
| 77 || June 26 || @ Blue Jays || 4–12 || Ryu (7–4) || Akin (0–4) || — || 5,913 || 24–53 || L1
|- style="background:#fbb;"
| 78 || June 27 || @ Blue Jays || 2–5 || Stripling (3–4) || López (2–10) || Romano (6) || 6,044 || 24–54 || L2
|- style="background:#bfb;"
| 79 || June 28 || @ Astros || 9–7 || Fry (2–2) || Bielak (2–3) || Plutko (1) || 24,419 || 25–54 || W1
|- style="background:#bfb;"
| 80 || June 29 || @ Astros || 13–3 || A. Wells (1–0) || Garza (0–2) || Tate (1) || 30,346 || 26–54 || W2
|- style="background:#bfb;"
| 81 || June 30 || @ Astros || 5–2 || Scott (3–3) || García (6–5) || Sulser (3) || 28,124 || 27–54 || W3
|-

|- style="background:#fbb;"
| 82 || July 2 || @ Angels || 7–8 || Iglesias (5–3) || Fry (2–3) || — || 23,561 || 27–55 || L1
|- style="background:#fbb;"
| 83 || July 3 || @ Angels || 1–4 || Cobb (6–3) || López (2–11) || Iglesias (16) || 28,160 || 27–56 || L2
|- style="background:#fbb;"
| 84 || July 4 || @ Angels || 5–6 || Iglesias (6–3) || Sulser (2–1) || — || 18,955 || 27–57 || L3
|- style="background:#bfb;"
| 85 || July 6 || Blue Jays || 7–5 || Watkins (1–0) || Matz (7–4) || — || 7,388 || 28–57 || W1
|- style="background:#fbb;"
| 86 || July 7 || Blue Jays || 2–10 || Ryu (8–5) || Harvey (3–10) || — || 7,457 || 28–58 || L1
|- style="background:#bbb;"
| — || July 8 || Blue Jays || colspan=7 | Postponed (rain). Makeup date September 11 as part of doubleheader.
|- style="background:#fbb;"
| 87 || July 9 || White Sox || 1–12 || Keuchel (7–3) || López (2–12) || — || 12,077 || 28–59 || L2
|- style="background:#fbb;"
| 88 || July 10 || White Sox || 3–8 || Giolito (7–6) || Eshelman (0–2) || Hendriks (23) || 26,391 || 28–60 || L3
|- style="background:#fbb;"
| 89 || July 11 || White Sox || 5–7  || Hendriks (4–2) || T. Wells (2–1) || Foster (1) || 11,600 || 28–61 || L4
|- bgcolor=#bbcaff
| ASG || July 13 || @ Coors Field || AL vs. NL || Ohtani (1–0) || Burnes (0–1) || Hendriks (1) || 49,184 || — || N/A
|- style="background:#fbb;"
| 90 || July 16 || @ Royals || 2–9 || Staumont (1–2) || Akin (0–5) || — || 23,763 || 28–62 || L5
|- style="background:#bfb;"
| 91 || July 17 || @ Royals || 8–4 || Fry (3–3) || Singer (3–7) || — || 27,292 || 29–62 || W1
|- style="background:#bfb;"
| 92 || July 18 || @ Royals || 5–0 || Harvey (4–10) || Hernández (1–1) || — || 13,706 || 30–62 || W2
|- style="background:#bfb;"
| 93 || July 19 || @ Rays || 6–1 || Watkins (2–0) || Yarbrough (6–4) || — || 9,922 || 31–62 || W3
|- style="background:#fbb;"
| 94 || July 20 || @ Rays || 3–9 || McClanahan (4–3) || Means (4–3) || — || 10,399 || 31–63 || L1
|- style="background:#fbb;"
| 95 || July 21 || @ Rays || 4–5 || McHugh (3–1) || Scott (3–4) || — || 8,968 || 31–64 || L2
|- style="background:#bfb;"
| 96 || July 23 || Nationals || 6–1 || Fry (4–3) || Corbin (6–9) || — || 17,022 || 32–64 || W1
|- style="background:#bfb;"
| 97 || July 24 || Nationals || 5–3 || Harvey (5–10) || Lester (3–5) || Tate (2) || 30,898 || 33–64 || W2
|- style="background:#bfb;"
| 98 || July 25 || Nationals || 5–4 || Sulser (3–1) || Hand (5–4) || — || 15,690 || 34–64 || W3
|- style="background:#fbb;"
| 99 || July 27 || Marlins || 3–7 || Alcántara (6–9) || Watkins (2–1) || — || 10,098 || 34–65 || L1
|- style="background:#bfb;"
| 100 || July 28 || Marlins || 8–7 || Scott (4–4) || Okert (0–1) || — || 8,363 || 35–65 || W1
|- style="background:#fbb;"
| 101 || July 29 || @ Tigers || 2–6 || Mize (6–5) || A. Wells (1–1) || — || 15,833 || 35–66 || L1
|- style="background:#bfb;"
| 102 || July 30 || @ Tigers || 4–3 || Harvey (6–10) || Skubal (6–10) || Sulser (4) || 18,861 || 36–66 || W1
|- style="background:#bfb;"
| 103 || July 31 || @ Tigers || 5–2 || Means (5–3) || Manning (2–4) || Sulser (5) || 25,132 || 37–66 || W2
|-

|- style="background:#fbb;"
| 104 || August 1 || @ Tigers || 2–6 || Ramírez (1–0) || Watkins (2–2) || — || 17,134 || 37–67 || L1
|- style="background:#bfb;"
| 105 || August 2 || @ Yankees || 7–1 || López (3–12) || Heaney (6–8) || — || 28,879 || 38–67 || W1
|- style="background:#fbb;"
| 106 || August 3 || @ Yankees || 1–13 || Gil (1–0) || Wells (1–2) || — || 30,815 || 38–68 || L1
|- style="background:#fbb;"
| 107 || August 4 || @ Yankees || 3–10 || Loáisiga (8–4) || Sulser (3–2) || — || 30,055 || 38–69 || L2
|- style="background:#fbb;"
| 108 || August 6 || Rays || 6–10 || Rasmussen (1–1) || Fry (4–4) || — || 11,320 || 38–70 || L3
|- style="background:#fbb;"
| 109 || August 7 || Rays || 3–12 || McClanahan (6–4) || Watkins (2–3) || — || 18,545 || 38–71 || L4
|- style="background:#fbb;"
| 110 || August 8 || Rays || 6–9 || Chargois (2–0) || Fry (4–5) || — || 10,576 || 38–72 || L5
|- style="background:#fbb;"
| 111 || August 10 || Tigers || 4–9 || Funkhouser (6–1) || Akin (0–6) || — || 7,124 || 38–73 || L6
|- style="background:#fbb;"
| 112 || August 11 || Tigers || 2–5 || Skubal (8–10) || Harvey (6–11) || Soto (14) || 8,990 || 38–74 || L7
|- style="background:#fbb;"
| 113 || August 12 || Tigers || 4–6 || Manning (3–5) || Means (5–4) || Fulmer (7) || 8,382 || 38–75 || L8
|- style="background:#fbb;"
| 114 || August 13 || @ Red Sox || 1–8 || Pivetta (9–5) || Watkins (2–4) || Richards (1) || 28,022 || 38–76 || L9
|- style="background:#fbb;"
| 115 || August 14 || @ Red Sox || 2–16 || Sale (1–0) || López (3–13) || — || 33,118 || 38–77 || L10
|- style="background:#fbb;"
| 116 || August 15 || @ Red Sox || 2–6 || Rodríguez (9–6) || Akin (0–7) || — || 28,935 || 38–78 || L11
|- style="background:#fbb;"
| 117 || August 16 || @ Rays || 2–9 || Fleming (10–6) || Harvey (6–12) || — || 5,460 || 38–79 || L12
|- style="background:#fbb;"
| 118 || August 17 || @ Rays || 0–10 || Ellis (1–0) || Means (5–5) || — || 4,795 || 38–80 || L13
|- style="background:#fbb;"
| 119 || August 18 || @ Rays || 4–8 || Yarbrough (7–4) || Watkins (2–5) || — || 6,673 || 38–81 || L14
|- style="background:#fbb;"
| 120 || August 19 || @ Rays || 2–7 || McClanahan (8–4) || López (3–14) || — || 5,826 || 38–82 || L15
|- style="background:#fbb;"
| 121 || August 20 || Braves || 0–3 || Fried (11–7) || Akin (0–8) || — || 13,583 || 38–83 || L16
|- style="background:#fbb;"
| 122 || August 21 || Braves || 4–5 || Smyly (9–3) || Harvey (6–13) || Smith (27) || 15,774 || 38–84 || L17
|- style="background:#fbb;"
| 123 || August 22 || Braves || 1–3 || Toussaint (3–2) || Means (5–6) || Smith (28) || 11,180 || 38–85 || L18
|- style="background:#fbb;"
| 124 || August 24 || Angels || 8–14 || Guerra (4–2) || Watkins (2–6) || — || 8,781 || 38–86 || L19
|- style="background:#bfb;"
| 125 || August 25 || Angels || 10–6 || Scott (5–4) || Petricka (0–1) || — || 15,867 || 39–86 || W1
|- style="background:#bfb;"
| 126 || August 26 || Angels || 13–1 || Akin (1–8) || Peguero (0–1) || — || 10,211 || 40–86 || W2
|- style="background:#fbb;"
| 127 || August 27 || Rays || 3–6 || McClanahan (9–4) || Harvey (6–14) || Mazza (1) || 7,155 || 40–87 || L1
|- style="background:#933;"
| 128 || August 28 || Rays || 3–4 || Chargois (4–0) || Sulser (3–3) || Kittredge (4) || 11,110 || 40–88 || L2
|- style="background:#fbb;"
| 129 ||August 29|| Rays ||8–12|| Chargois (5–0)|| Watkins (2–7)|| — || 8,353 || 40–89 || L3
|- style="background:#fbb;"
| 130 || August 30 || @ Blue Jays || 3–7 || Ray (10–5) || Tate (0–4) || Romano (14) || 14,406 || 40–90 || L4
|- style="background:#bfb;"
| 131 || August 31 || @ Blue Jays || 4–2 || Akin (2–8) || Ryu (12–8) || Sulser (6) || 13,963 || 41–90 || W1
|-

|- style="background:#fbb;"
| 132 || September 1 || @ Blue Jays || 4–5 || Mayza (5–2) || Tate (0–5) || Romano (15) || 14,262 || 41–91 || L1
|- style="background:#fbb;"
| 133 || September 3 || @ Yankees || 3–4  || Holmes (6–2) || Tate (0–6) || — || 34,085 || 41–92 || L2
|- style="background:#bfb;"
| 134 || September 4 || @ Yankees || 4–3 || Sulser (4–3) || Chapman (5–4) || — || 34,571 || 42–92 || W1
|- style="background:#bfb;"
| 135 || September 5 || @ Yankees || 8–7 || Diplán (1–0) || Heaney (8–9) || T. Wells (1) || 33,091 || 43–92 || W2
|- style="background:#fbb;"
| 136 || September 6 || Royals || 2–3 || Tapia (2–0) || Sulser (4–4) || Barlow (11) || 11,973 || 43–93 || L1
|- style="background:#bfb;"
| 137 || September 7 || Royals || 7–3 || Baumann (1–0) || Kowar (0–3) || — || 4,981 || 44–93 || W1
|- style="background:#bfb;"
| 138 || September 8 || Royals || 9–8 || Barreda (1–0) || Staumont (3–3) || T. Wells (2) || 4,965 || 45–93 || W2
|- style="background:#fbb;"
| 139 || September 9 || Royals || 0–6 || Hernández (6–1) || Means (5–7) || — || 5,087 || 45–94 || L1
|- style="background:#bfb;"
| 140 || September 10 || Blue Jays || 6–3 || Greene (1–0) || Merryweather (0–1) || Sulser (7) || 11,851 || 46–94 || W1
|- style="background:#fbb;"
| 141 || September 11  || Blue Jays || 10–11 || Pearson (1–1) || T. Wells (2–2) || Romano (17) || N/A || 46–95 || L1
|- style="background:#fbb;"
| 142 || September 11  || Blue Jays || 2–11 || Richards (7–2) || Akin (2–9) || — || 10,219 || 46–96 || L2
|- style="background:#fbb;"
| 143 || September 12 || Blue Jays || 7–22 || Matz (12–7) || Lowther (0–2) || — ||  8,474 || 46–97 || L3
|- style="background:#fbb;"
| 144 || September 14 || Yankees || 2–7 || Cole (15–7) || A. Wells (1–3) || — || 10,235 || 46–98 || L4
|- style="background:#fbb;"
| 145 || September 15 || Yankees || 3–4 || Peralta (5–3) || T. Wells (2–3) || Chapman (27) || 10,402 || 46–99 || L5
|- style="background:#bfb;"
| 146 || September 16 || Yankees || 3–2  || Sulser (5–4) || Peralta (5–4) || — || 20,164 || 47–99 || W1
|- style="background:#fbb;"
| 147 || September 17 || @ Red Sox || 1–7 || Sale (4–0) || Akin (2–10) || — || 29,811 || 47–100 || L1
|- style="background:#fbb;"
| 148 || September 18 || @ Red Sox || 3–9 || Houck (1–4) || Baumann (1–1) || — || 30,027 || 47–101 || L2
|- style="background:#fbb;"
| 149 || September 19 || @ Red Sox || 6–8 || Sawamura (5–1) || Greene (1–1) || Richards (3) || 27,010 || 47–102 || L3
|- style="background:#bfb;"
| 150 || September 20 || @ Phillies || 2–0 || Means (6–7) || Suárez (6–5) || T. Wells (3) || 21,440 || 48–102 || W1
|- style="background:#fbb;"
| 151 || September 21 || @ Phillies || 2–3  || Kennedy (3–1) || Valdez (2–2) || — || 18,955 || 48–103 || L1
|- style="background:#fbb;"
| 152 || September 22 || @ Phillies || 3–4 || Alvarado (7–1) || Greene (1–2) || Kennedy (25) || 18,133 || 48–104 || L2
|- style="background:#bfb;"
| 153 || September 23 || Rangers || 3–0 || Lowther (1–2) || Otto (0–3) || T. Wells (4) || 6,328 || 49–104 || W1
|- style="background:#fbb;"
| 154 || September 24 || Rangers || 5–8 || Sborz (4–3) || Greene (1–3) || Barlow (8) || 7,935 || 49–105 || L1
|- style="background:#bfb;"
| 155 || September 25 || Rangers || 3–2 || Kriske (2–1) || Lyles (9–13) || Tate (3) || 10,645 || 50–105 || W1
|- style="background:#fbb;"
| 156 || September 26 || Rangers || 4–7 || Cotton (2–0) || Means (6–8) || Barlow (9) || 13,495 || 50–106 || L1
|- style="background:#bfb;"
| 157 || September 28 || Red Sox || 4–2 || Diplán (2–0) || Sale (5–1) || Sulser (8) || 8,098 || 51–106 || W1
|- style="background:#fbb;"
| 158 || September 29 || Red Sox || 0–6 || Eovaldi (11–9) || Lowther (1–3) || — || 8,732 || 51–107 || L1
|- style="background:#bfb;"
| 159 || September 30 || Red Sox || 6–2 || A. Wells (2–3) || Pivetta (9–8) || — || 13,012 || 52–107 || W1
|- style="background:#fbb;"
| 160 || October 1 || @ Blue Jays || 4–6 || Matz (14–7) || Eshelman (0–3) || Romano (23) || 28,855 || 52–108 || L1
|- style="background:#fbb;"
| 161 || October 2 || @ Blue Jays || 1–10 || Manoah (9–2) || Means (6–9) || — || 29,916 || 52–109 || L2
|- style="background:#fbb;"
| 162 || October 3 || @ Blue Jays || 4–12 || Ryu (14–10) || Zimmermann (4–5) || — || 29,942 || 52–110 || L3
|-

Roster

Achievements
 John Means pitched a complete game no hitter, defeating the Seattle Mariners 6–0 on May 5.

Farm system

References

External links 
 Baltimore Orioles 2021 schedule at MLB.com
 2021 Baltimore Orioles season at Baseball Reference

Baltimore Orioles seasons
Baltimore Orioles
Baltimore Orioles